Biskupiec-Kolonia Pierwsza  is a settlement in the administrative district of Gmina Biskupiec, within Olsztyn County, Warmian-Masurian Voivodeship, in northern Poland.

The settlement has a population of 9.

References

Biskupiec-Kolonia Pierwsza